Primula standleyana, synonym Dodecatheon ellisiae, is a species of flowering plant in the family Primulaceae, native to Arizona, New Mexico and Northeast Mexico. It was first described by Paul Carpenter Standley in 1913 as Dodecatheon ellisiae. When the genus Dodecatheon was reduced to Primula sect. Dodecatheon following molecular phylogenetic studies, the species could not be transferred to Primula as Primula ellisiae, as that name had already been used for a different species (now regarded as a synonym of Primula rusbyi). Accordingly, the replacement name Primula standleyana was provided.

References

standleyana
Flora of Arizona
Flora of New Mexico
Flora of Northeastern Mexico
Plants described in 1913